HMS Rapid was an R-class destroyer of the Royal Navy that saw service during the Second World War and was sunk as a target in 1981.

Second World War service

During build Rapid was adopted by the civil communities of Sutton and Cheam as part of the Warship Week National savings campaign in 1943.

In February 1943 Rapid began sea trials and was allocated for service with the 11th Destroyer Flotilla. Her first patrols were as convoy defence on Atlantic convoys, travelling to Freetown, and by the end of 1943 she was allocated for service in the Eastern Fleet, based in Ceylon.

In March 1945 Rapid was part of Force 68, serving in the Indian Ocean, and later the Pacific. In one operation she was damaged by fire from a shore battery, with 11 killed and 23 wounded. She was towed to Akyab for repairs. The repairs were completed by August 1945, and she returned for service in the planned landings on Malaya, as part of Operation Zipper, which were cancelled on the dropping of the atomic bomb.

Postwar service
In 1946 Rapid commissioned as an air training target ship and attendant destroyer to aircraft carriers. In February 1947 she was based at Rosyth.

Between June 1951 and October 1953, she was converted into a Type 15 fast anti-submarine frigate, by Alex Stephen on the Clyde, with the new pennant number F138. Between 1954 and 1965 Rapid was part of the Reserve Fleet, but did take part in 'Navy Days' in Portsmouth during 1959.

On 6 July 1971 Rapid would participate in a race against a similar ship, . Rapid narrowly lost the race after a safety valve blew.

Decommissioning and disposal
In 1965 Rapid was placed on the disposal list. However, in 1966 she was allocated to the shore establishment  to assist in the sea training of engine room artificers. The ship was used as a day runner from Rosyth Dockyard to give help in certificating artificers, who were under training. Rapid was replaced in this role by the frigate  in 1973.

She then became a target ship, being damaged by missiles launches from the guided missile destroyer  in 1976. Following repairs in 1977 she was used as a target ship in Milford Haven. She was placed on the disposal list again in 1978. She was subsequently sunk in the Western Approaches by torpedoes from the submarine  in 1981.

References

Publications
 
 
 
 
 
 
 
 
 
 

 

1942 ships
Maritime incidents in 1981
Q and R-class destroyers of the Royal Navy
Ships built on the River Mersey
Ships sunk as targets
Type 15 frigates
World War II destroyers of the United Kingdom